Viva Records may refer to:

Viva Records (U.S.), subsidiary of Snuff Garrett Records
Viva Records (Philippines), a Philippine record label

See also
Viva (disambiguation)